Junoon is a Pakistani sufi rock band, formed in 1990 by lead guitarist Salman Ahmad. The band has released seven studio albums: Junoon (1991), Talaash (1993), Inquilaab (1996), Azadi (1997), Parvaaz (1999), Andaz (2001), and Dewaar (2003). All of the albums have been released through EMI. As one of the most commercially successful sufi rock bands of all time, Junoon have sold over 30 million albums worldwide.

After several of their albums topped the Pakistani Music Charts, one of their albums, Azadi, received a Channel V Awards nomination for the "Best International Album" in 1998. Also, Junoon were awarded "The Best International Group Award" at the Channel V Awards and they received an award for their "Contribution to Asian Culture" at the BBC Asian Awards. In 1999, UNESCO presented them with an award for their "Outstanding Achievements in Music and Peace" as they were invited to perform at the Music for Peace concert held in Paris, France. In 2002, the band was nominated for the "Best Music Act" at the Lux Style Awards. In 2004 at the Indus Music Awards, Junoon seventh studio album, Dewaar, was nominated for the "Best Album" along with single "Pappu Yaar" from the album being nominated for the "Best Music Video" and "Best Song" awards. Also, Junoon were awarded the "Best Band Award". Later the same year, Junoon seventh studio album was again nominated for the "Best Album" and singles, "Garaj Baras" and "Pappu Yaar", were nominated for the "Best Song" and "Best Music Video" at the ARY Asian/Bollywood Awards held in Dubai, UAE. In the same year, Junoon's single "Garaj Baras" was nominated for "Best Soundtrack" and "Best Song" awards at the Sahara Awards as being part of the Indian film Paap, and also, South Asian Journalists Association awarded Junoon for the "Outstanding story on South Asia - Broadcast Award". In 2006, at ARY The Musik Awards the band was nominated for the "Best Live Act". Later the same year, Junoon won "The Muslim Public Affairs Council Annual Media Award". Overall, Junoon have received seven awards from nineteen nominations.

Lux Style Awards
The Lux Style Awards are the Pakistani Phonographic Industry's annual awards. The Lux Style Awards is considered one of the nation's premier award show events.  The awards have been dubbed "Pakistan's Oscars" and described as "'the' awards ceremony in Pakistan."

The Musik Awards

Indus Music Awards
Indus Music Awards are regarded as the first music awards show in Pakistan. Junoon have been nominated thrice and have won one award.

Channel V Awards
Channel V declared the "Best International Group Award" to Junoon among Aqua, Boyzone, The Prodigy and Backstreet Boys.

Other awards

ARY Asian/Bollywood Awards

Sahara Awards

BBC Asian Awards
BBC Asian Awards are an annual award ceremony by BBC. It is regarded as the largest Asian festival outside of South Asia. In 1998, Junoon headlined the BBC Mega Mela and were awarded for their "Contribution to Asian Culture" by BBC at London, United Kingdom.

South Asian Journalists Association Awards

The Muslim Public Affairs Council Annual Media Awards

Other achievements
Outstanding Achievements in Music and Peace by UNESCO
Salman Ahmad named "Goodwill Ambassador" of Pakistan by United Nations

References

External links

Junoon
Awards